Bethany Donaphin (born 1980 in New York City, New York, United States), is Head of League Operations at the Women's National Basketball Association and has been recognized for her professional achievements in sports. She is 6'2''.

She is a former American basketball player. She played for New York Liberty as forward during the 2004–2005 season. She also played for Famila Schio in Italy and played for Fenerbahçe İstanbul in Turkey (2004–05).

She played collegiately for Stanford University.

Early life
Bethany Donaphin is a native of Midtown Manhattan, attending The Cathedral School of St. John the Divine and the Horace Mann School before matriculating to Stanford University, where she continues to be a star alumna. Bethany capped her academic career with an MBA from Wharton School of the University of Pennsylvania.

As a youngster, Bethany coupled basketball with dance lessons at The Harlem School of the Arts, Dance Theatre of Harlem, and Alvin Ailey American Dance Theater.

Stanford statistics
Source

References

External links
WNBA Profile

1980 births
Living people
American expatriate basketball people in Italy
American expatriate basketball people in Turkey
New York Liberty players
Fenerbahçe women's basketball players
Stanford Cardinal women's basketball players
Basketball players from New York City
American women's basketball players